Johann Carl Friedrich Dauthe (26 September 1746 – 13 July 1816) was a German architect and etcher who specialised in the Neo-Classical style.

Dauthe was born in Leipzig and educated by Adam Friedrich Oeser. In his hometown, where he had been the city's construction official most of his buildings have been built, such as the first concert chamber of the Gewandhaus (1781), the square now known as the Augustusplatz (1785) and the interior of the St. Nicholas Church (1794). Dauthe became member of the Lodge Minerva zu den drei Palmen Leipzig in 1778. He died at the age of 70 in the small Silesian city of Bad Flinsberg.

See also
 Promenadenring (Leipzig)

External links
Masonic Lodge Minerva zu den drei Palmen Leipzig

1746 births
1816 deaths
18th-century German architects
German neoclassical architects
Architects from Leipzig
German etchers